Leinestraße  is a Berlin U-Bahn station located on the  line.

The station was built by Alfred Grenander and A. Fehse in 1929. In the 1930s the southern tunnel was extended towards Hermanstraße for the then-uncompleted extension of the U-Bahn to Hermanstraße. During World War II the tunnel served as air raid shelter.

In the 1960s the extended tunnel was used by Berlin Transport for parking of disused subway trains.

In 1996, the subway station at Hermanstraẞe was finally completed so travelers now have direct access to the Berlin S-Bahn one stop after Leinestrasse.

The color of this station is light green, with green tiles on the walls.

References

External links

U8 (Berlin U-Bahn) stations
Buildings and structures in Neukölln
Railway stations in Germany opened in 1929